Vittoria Aganoor (26 May 1855 – 9 April 1910) was an Italian poet with Armenian ancestry. She is considered a "minor but important figure in nineteenth century poetry".

Biography 
She was born in Padova, the seventh child of Edoardo Aganoor and Giuseppina Pacini. Her father's family was wealthy Armenian nobility. They had moved to Persia in the eleventh century, settling in Julfa. Later on, acting on the advice of Mechitarist fathers, the family migrated to live in Paris. In France, they founded two notable educational institutions for Armenian nobility: The Collège Raphaël in Paris, followed by the Collegio Moorat in Venice.

Vittoria's parents married in 1847 and moved to Padova. There they took up residence in the 'Casa degli Armeni', or 'House of the Armenians', in Prato della Valle. It was here that Vittoria, along with her four sisters, spent her childhood and adolescence.

Many Italian celebrities, such as Andrea Maffei or Antonio Fogazzaro, visited their home when she was a child. In 1876 she went living to Naples, where she met Enrico Nencioni, who helped her with her poetry, although she wrote letters more often to Domenico Gnoli. She was very emotionally dependent on her family because of her depressive moods and although she was a precocious writer, she did not publish her first book, Leggenda eterna, until 1900. In 1901, she married Guido Pompilj, a well-known member of parliament, and later the Italian Undersecretary of State. Together they went to Perugia. She died from surgery in Rome on 9 April 1910, aged 54.

Her husband, heartbroken by her death, committed suicide shortly thereafter next to her corpse.

Works
I cavalli di San Marco, Venezia, Stab. Tip. C. Ferrari, 1892;
A mio padre. Versi, Venezia, Stab. Tip. Lit. C. Ferrari, 1893;
Leggenda eterna, Milano, Treves, 1900
Nuove Liriche, Roma, Nuova antologia, 1908;
Poesie complete, Firenze, F. Le Monnier, 1927;
Nuove liriche, a cura di John Butcher, Bologna, Nuova S1, 2007;

References

External links
Vittoria Aganoor's biography

1855 births
1910 deaths
Writers from Padua
Italian women poets
19th-century Italian poets
19th-century Italian women writers
19th-century Italian writers
Italian people of Armenian descent
Deaths from cancer in Lazio